Four Hole Swamp is a small blackwater river that is a tributary to the Edisto River in South Carolina. The swamp rises in Calhoun County and flows  to the confluence. The river is noteworthy for its unusual braided pattern; it has no well-defined channel but instead has multiple channels that start and disappear, maintaining a flow.

The swamp is the home of the Francis Beidler Forest, a  nature preserve containing over 1,800 acres  of virgin cypress and tupelo forest owned and operated by the National Audubon Society. Some of the trees are over 1500 years in age, and the forest is the home of a number of rare or endangered species.

References

Rivers of South Carolina
Landforms of Dorchester County, South Carolina
Landforms of Colleton County, South Carolina
Landforms of Berkeley County, South Carolina
Landforms of Orangeburg County, South Carolina
Landforms of Calhoun County, South Carolina
Swamps of South Carolina